Cheesecake is a dessert.

Cheesecake or cheese cake may also refer to:

Music
 Cheese Cake (album), by Dexter Gordon
 "Cheescake" (Teo song), by Belarusian singer Teo
 "Cheese Cake", a song on the Aerosmith album Night in the Ruts (1979)
"Cheese Cake", a song on the Dexter Gordon album Go (1962)

Other uses
 Agent Cheesecake, a Marvel comics character
 Cheesecake Road, in York County, Virginia
 Half of the duo Bubbles & Cheesecake, an online multimedia collaboration
 Glamour photography, of women emphasizing sex appeal
 Pin-up models, women posing suggestively

See also